Bella Lewitzky (January 13, 1916, Los Angeles, California – July 16, 2004, Pasadena, California) was an American modern dance choreographer, dancer and teacher.

Biography
Born to Jewish Russian immigrants, Lewitzky spent her childhood on a ranch in San Bernardino and in a utopian socialist colony in the Mojave Desert. She moved back to Los Angeles in her teens, and briefly studied ballet. In 1934, she joined Lester Horton's company, became its lead dancer, and was instrumental in the development of the Horton Technique.

In 1946 Lewitzky founded Dance Theater of Los Angeles with Horton. The Dance Theater was one of the few institutions in the United States to house both a dance school and theater under the same roof. She left the company in 1950 to pursue her own interests and an independent career. She appeared as a specialty dancer in the 1943 Technicolor adventure film White Savage, and she  choreographed the films Bagdad (1949) (with Lester Horton), Tripoli (1950), and Prehistoric Women (1950).

In 1951, she was subpoenaed by the House Un-American Activities Committee to answer questions about communist activities in the arts. "I'm a dancer, not a singer", she replied.

In 1955 Lewitzky gave birth to her only child, her daughter Nora. The same year she moved her rehearsals to Idyllwild, California, a small town in the San Jacinto Mountains outside of Los Angeles. In 1956 she became the founding chair of the dance department at the Idyllwild School of Music and the Arts, which has since been renamed the Idyllwild Arts Academy. She taught at the school until 1972. Her daughter, Nora, joined the dance faculty in 2003 and continues teaching Lewitzky technique.  The Idyllwild Arts Academy is one of the few dance programs in the United States that offers Lewitzky Technique as part of their curriculum.

In 1966, she founded the Lewitzky Dance Company. Under her artistic guidance, the company became one of the leading international modern dance companies, performing to critical acclaim in forty-three states across the U.S. as well as twenty countries on five continents. Among her dance associates was the former television child actress Noreen Corcoran of Bachelor Father.

In 1970, she was the founding dean of the dance program at California Institute of the Arts (CalArts) in Valencia. In 1990 Lewitzky crossed out the anti-obscenity clause on the acceptance form of a $72,000 National Endowment for the Arts grant. She successfully sued NEA-chairman John Frohnmayer to have the grant reinstated. The New York Times quoted her as saying in response, "I've been struggling in dance for 28 years. To exist merely to exist is stupidity. To exist to make art is a pretty grand act."

Personal life
Lewitzky was married to Newell Taylor Reynolds, an architect and set designer whom she met while they were dancers at Lester Horton's company.  Reynolds designed sets for the Lewitzky Dance Company.

Their wedding reception was in the Samuel Freeman House, which they frequented as part of an avant garde salon.

Awards and honors
Lewitzky received many awards including honorary doctorates from California Institute of Arts (1981), Occidental College (1984), Otis Parsons College (1989), and the Juilliard School (1993).  In 1991 she was a recipient of the Heritage Award from the National Dance Association. In 1996, she was awarded the National Medal of Arts.

References

Further reading
 "Bella Lewitzky."  State of the Arts: California Artists Talk about Their Work.  Ed. Barbara Isenberg.  Chicago, IL: Ivan R. Dee, 2000.  3–7.  .

External links
 USC Libraries: Lewitzky Dance Co. Archive

Bella Lewitzky Website
Bella Lewitzky Facebook Page
Bella Lewitzky Instagram
Bella Lewitzky Twitter

1916 births
2004 deaths
American choreographers
American female dancers
Dancers from California
Jewish dancers
People from Greater Los Angeles
People from San Bernardino, California
United States National Medal of Arts recipients
20th-century American dancers
20th-century American women
21st-century American women